The Italy national fencing team represents Italy in International fencing competitions such as Olympic Games or World Fencing Championships.

History
The national Italian fencing team participated to all the Summer Olympics editions, from Paris 1900, 26 times on 28.

Medal tables

Olympic Games

Medals by event

Paris 1900

London 1908

Stockholm 1912

Antwerp 1920

Paris 1924

Los Angeles 1932

Berlin 1936

London 1948

Helsinki 1952

Melbourne 1956

Rome 1960

Tokyo 1964

Mexico City 1968

Munich 1972

Montreal 1976

Moscow 1980

Los Angeles 1984

Seoul 1988

Barcelona 1992

Atlanta 1996

Sydney 2000

Athens 2004

Beijing 2008

London 2012

Rio 2016

Tokyo 2020

Multiple medalists

Olympic Games
The list refers to individual and team events and include men and women (in pink color), sorted by number of individual titles.

World Championships
The list refers to individual and team events and include men and women (in pink color), sorted by number of individual titles.

See also
Italian Fencing Federation
Italy at the Olympics
Fencing Olympics medal table
World Championships medal table
European Championships medal table

References

External links
Italy fencing at Summer Olympics
 All medals from the site of the Federazione Italiana Scherma

Fencing
Fencing in Italy
National fencing teams